Debenham Thouard Zadelhoff, known as DTZ, was a European joint venture originated from UK, France and the Netherlands, operating as a commercial real estate services firm.

On September 1, 2015, Cushman & Wakefield and DTZ merged.

In December 2011, the parent company DTZ Holdings was placed into administration and its business entities were sold to UGL in order to repay 77.5m of an outstanding 106m debt owed to Royal Bank of Scotland and its shareholders equity was wiped out after a deal with its majority shareholder Saint George Participations and BNP Paribas Real Estate fell through. the company was reportedly worth almost 500m around 2006. The company was in financial difficulty after a spending spree prior to financial crisis buying Rockwood in the US and retail agent Donaldsons. 

2015: On May 11, 2015, DTZ announced the purchase of Cushman and Wakefield.  When the deal closes, the expected combined employee count will be 43,000.

On September 1, 2015, DTZ merged with Cushman & Wakefield. Cushman & Wakefield is among the largest commercial real estate services firms with revenue of $5 billion. The firm operates in more than 60 countries and has 50,000+ employees.

DTZ Investors now exists as an entity of Cushman & Wakefield and operates as a full service vertically integrated real estate manager managing more than $17.8 billion of property.

References 

Property companies based in London
Property services companies of the United Kingdom
Real estate services companies of the United States
Property management companies
Commercial real estate companies